Gundemar was a Visigothic King of Hispania, Septimania and Galicia (610–612).

Reign
Gundemar continued a policy of amity with Clotaire II of Neustria and Theodobert II of Austrasia. To this end, he sent grand sums of money to support their cause against their relative (cousin and brother, respectively) Theuderic II of Burgundy. At other times, he pursued a hostile policy against Brunhilda.

According to Isidore of Seville, Gundemar made one expedition against the Basques, then besieged the Byzantines in the next. He died a natural death in Toledo, probably in February or March 612. The Chronica Regum Visigotthorum records that Gundemar reigned for one year, ten months and 14 days. He was succeeded by Sisebut.

He was married to Hildoara.

Legacy
The towns of Gondomar in Portugal and in Galicia are named after him.

References

External links
 Coins of King Gundemar

7th-century Visigothic monarchs
Gothic warriors
612 deaths
Year of birth unknown